The 6th Louis Vuitton Cup was held in Auckland, New Zealand, in 2003. The winner, Alinghi, went on to challenge for and win the 2003 America's Cup.

The teams
The Yacht Club Punta Ala was the challenger of record.

Alinghi
Founded by Swiss businessman Ernesto Bertarelli, Alinghi featured Russell Coutts and Brad Butterworth who had both joined from Team New Zealand. Jochen Schuemann was also involved in the team.

GBR Challenge
Put together by Peter Harrison and New Zealander David Barnes, the team was skippered by Ian Walker and included Jim Turner. GBR 70 was known as Wight Lightning while GBR 78 was called Wight Magic.

Le Defi Areva
Despite 2000 skipper Bertrand Pace joining Team New Zealand, Le Defi returned in 2003 with Luc Pillot skippering FRA 79.

Mascalzone Latino
Headed by shipping magnate Vincenzo Onorato, Mascalzone Latino featured an all-Italian crew. The syndicate was only established in 2001 and Paolo Cian served as helmsman and the crew included Flavio Favini, Shannon Falcone, Giuseppe Brizzi, Davide Scarpa, and Pierluigi De Felice. and Francesco De vita

OneWorld
Part-financed by Microsoft mogul Paul Allen, OneWorld was based in Seattle. Skippered by Peter Gilmour, the team was docked one Louis Vuitton point by an arbitration panel for being in possession of design secrets from another team.

The design team included Laurie Davidson, Bruce Nelson and Phil Kaiko and the sailing team included 10 Olympic medallists, three round-the-world winners, 60 world championship titles in various classes, and 16 America's Cup winners.

The crew included Kevin Shoebridge as a trimmer, Mark Mendelblatt as backup helmsman, Kevin Hall, Rick Dodson, David Endean, Grant Spanhake, Peter Waymouth, Matt Mason, Joey Newton, James Spithill, Jeremy Scantlebury, Alan Smith, Andy Fethers, Andrew Taylor, Scott Crawford, and Olympians Craig Monk, Don Cowie, Ben Ainslie, Kelvin Harrap, Charles and Jonathan McKee.

Oracle BMW Racing
Founded by Larry Ellison who bought the assets of 2000 syndicate AmericaOne. The team was skippered by Peter Holmberg and also featured Paul Cayard, Matt Welling, John Cutler, Phil Jameson, Brad Webb, Brian MacInnes, Cameron Dunn, and Chris Dickson. USA 71 and USA 76 were designed by Bruce Farr.

Roy Heiner sailed the trial boat.

Prada Challenge
Founded by Patrizio Bertelli, Prada's crew included members of the 2000 Young America syndicate. They were again skippered by Francesco de Angelis and Rod Davis, Pietro D'Ali, Thomas Burnham, Hartwell Jordan, Piero Romeo, Gavin Brady, Francesco Bruni, Andrew Hemmings, Steven Erickson, Matteo Plazzi, Gilberto Nobili, Massimo Gherarducci, Alberto Barovier, and Torben Grael were in the crew.

Team Dennis Conner
Team Dennis Conner's USA 77 suffered a massive blow when it sank off the Californian coast in July before the Cup began. The helmsman was Ken Read and the team included Terry Hutchinson.

Victory Challenge
Principal backer Jan Stenbeck died of a heart attack in August 2002. This was Sweden's first America's Cup bid since 1992 and the crew included Magnus Holmberg, Lars Linger, Stefan Rahm, Mikkel Røssberg, Jesper Bank, Mats Johansson, Roger Hall and Olympian Magnus Augustson.

Their boats were designed by Germán Frers and Cole (Skip) Lissiman was their coach.

Round robin

* OneWorld was docked one race win.

Finals

Quarter-finals

Finals

References

External links
Ultimatesail.com

Louis Vuitton Cup
Louis Vuitton Cup
Louis Vuitton Cup
Sport in Auckland
Sailing competitions in New Zealand
2003 America's Cup
International America's Cup Class
Auckland waterfront
Waitematā Harbour